Buddhist scripture condemns violence in every form. Ahimsa, a term meaning 'not to injure', is a primary virtue in Buddhism. However, Buddhists have historically used scriptures to justify violence or form exceptions to commit violence for various reasons. As found in other religious traditions, Buddhism has an extensive history of violence dating back to its inception. This article discusses Buddhist principles with regard to violence, and also provides certain, historical instances concerning the use of violence by Buddhists, including acts of aggression committed by Buddhists with political and socio-cultural motivations, as well as self-inflicted violence by ascetics or for religious purposes. Despite these historical instances, as far as the Buddha's teachings and scriptures are concerned, Buddhism discourages violence for resolving conflicts. Contemporary violence, or the promotion of violence, has been on the rise in some Buddhist communities, most notably the persecution of the Rohingya by the Myanmar government.

Teachings, interpretations, and practices

Buddhism encompasses a variety of traditions, beliefs and spiritual practices largely based on teachings attributed to Gautama Buddha.

Nirvana is the earliest and most common term for the end goal of the Buddhist path and the ultimate eradication of duḥkha—nature of life that innately includes "suffering", "pain", or "unsatisfactoriness". Violent actions and thoughts, actions which harm and debase others and thoughts which contemplate the same, stand in the way of spiritual growth and the self-conquest which leads to the goal of existence and they are normally deemed unskilled (akusala) and cannot lead to the goal of Nirvana. Buddha condemned killing or harming living beings and encouraged reflection or mindfulness (satipatthana) as right action (or conduct), therefore "the rightness or wrongness of an action centers around whether the action itself would bring about harm to self and/or others". In the Ambalatthika-Rahulovada Sutta, the Buddha says to Rahula:

The right action or right conduct (samyak-karmānta / sammā-kammanta) is the fourth aspect of the Noble Eightfold Path and it said that the practitioner should train oneself to be morally upright in one's activities, not acting in ways that would be corrupt or bring harm to oneself or to others. In the Chinese and Pali Canon, it is explained as:

For the lay follower, the Cunda Kammaraputta Sutta elaborates:

Sarambha can be translated as "accompanied by violence". As the mind filled with lobha, dosa and moha (lust, hatred and delusion) is led to actions which are akusala. Indulging in violence is a form of self-harming. The rejection of violence in society is recognized in Buddhism as a prerequisite for the spiritual progress of society's members, because violence brings pain to beings with similar feelings to oneself. The Buddha is quoted in the Dhammapada as saying, "All are afraid of the stick, all hold their lives dear. Putting oneself in another's place, one should not beat or kill others". Metta (loving kindness), the development of mindstates of limitless good-will for all beings, and karuna, compassion that arises when you see someone suffering of the human being, are attitudes said to be excellent or sublime because they are the right or ideal way of conduct towards living beings (sattesu samma patipatti). The Sutta Nipata says As I am, so are these. As are these, so am I.' Drawing the parallel to yourself, neither kill nor get others to kill."

In Buddhism, to take refuge in the Dharma—one of the Three Jewels—one should not harm other sentient beings. The Nirvana Sutra states, "By taking refuge in the precious Dharma, One's minds should be free from hurting or harming others". One of the Five Precepts of Buddhist ethics or śīla states, "I undertake the training rule to abstain from killing." The Buddha reportedly stated, "Victory breeds hatred. The defeated live in pain. Happily the peaceful live giving up victory and defeat." These elements are used to indicate Buddhism is pacifistic and all violence done by Buddhists, even monks, is likely due to economic or political reasons.

The teaching of right speech (samyag-vāc / sammā-vācā) in the Noble Eightfold Path, condemn all speech that is in any way harmful (malicious and harsh speech) and divisive, encouraging to speak in thoughtful and helpful ways. The Pali Canon explained:

Michael Jerryson, Associate Professor of Religious Studies at Ohio's Youngstown State University and co-editor of the book Buddhist Warfare, said that "Buddhism differs in that the act of killing is less the focus than the 'intention' behind the killing" and "The first thing to remember is that people have a penchant for violence, it just so happens that every religion has people in it."

Gananath Obeyesekere, Emeritus Professor of Anthropology at Princeton University, said that "in the Buddhist doctrinal tradition... there is little evidence of intolerance, no justification for violence, no conception even of 'just wars' or 'holy wars.' ... one can make an assertion that Buddhist doctrine is impossible to reconcile logically with an ideology of violence and intolerance"

"Killing to save lives" is, uniquely amongst Buddhist schools considered justified by certain Mahayana scriptures such as the Upaya-kaushalya Sutra where, in a past life, Shakyamuni Buddha kills a robber intent on mass murder on a ship (with the intent both of saving the lives of the passengers and saving the robber from bad karma). K. Sri Dhammananda taught warfare is accepted as a last resort, quoting the Buddha's conversation with a soldier. The 14th Dalai Lama has also spoken on when it is permissible to kill another person. During a lecture he was giving at Harvard University in 2009, the Dalai Lama invoked the Upaya-kaushalya Sutra and said that "wrathful forceful action" motivated by compassion, may be "violence on a physical level" but is "essentially nonviolence", and we must be careful to understand what "nonviolence" means. Following the killing of Osama bin Laden in 2011, the Dalai Lama endorsed his killing, stating "Forgiveness doesn't mean forget what happened. ... If something is serious and it is necessary to take counter-measures, you have to take counter-measures." During a question panel in 2015, in which he was asked if it would be justified to kill Hitler, Stalin, Pol Pot, or Mao while they were early into their campaigns of genocide, the Dalai Lama stated that it would be justified, so long as they were not killed in anger.

In addition capital punishment for murder is justified according to this interpretation of Buddhism because the Judge is not seen as causing death but rather the actions of the murderer executed are.

There is also in Buddhism a long tradition of self-inflicted violence and death, as a form of asceticism or protest, as exemplified by the use of fires and burns to show determinations among Chinese monks, by the self-immolations of monks such as Thích Quảng Đức during the Vietnam war or Tibetan monks in support of Tibetan independence.

Regional examples

Southeast Asia

Thailand

In Southeast Asia, Thailand has had several prominent virulent Buddhist monastic calls for violence. In the 1970s, nationalist Buddhist monks like Phra Kittiwuttho argued that killing communists did not violate any of the Buddhist precepts. The militant side of Thai Buddhism became prominent again in 2004 when a Malay Muslim insurgency renewed in Thailand's deep south. At first Buddhist monks ignored the conflict as they viewed it as political and not religious but eventually they adopted an "identity-formation", as practical realities require deviations from religious ideals.

Myanmar

In recent years the State Peace and Development Council (SPDC), the military regime of Burma from 1988 to 2011, had strongly encouraged the conversion of ethnic minorities, often by force, as part of its campaign of assimilation. The regime promoted a vision of Burmese Buddhist nationalism as a cultural and a political ideology to legitimise its contested rule, trying to bring a religious syncretism between Buddhism and its totalitarian ideology.

The Saffron Revolution, a series of economic and political protests and demonstrations that took place during 2007, were led by students, political activists, including women, and Buddhist monks and took the form of a campaign of nonviolent resistance, sometimes also called civil resistance.

In response to the protests dozens of protesters were arrested or detained. Starting in September 2007 the protests were led by thousands of Buddhist monks, and those protests were allowed to proceed until a renewed government crackdown in late September 2007. At least 184 protesters were shot and killed and many were tortured. Under the SPDC, the Burmese army engaged in military offensives against ethnic minority populations, committing acts that violated international humanitarian law.

Myanmar had become a stronghold of Buddhist aggression and such acts are spurred by hardline nationalistic monks. The oldest militant organisation active in the region is Democratic Karen Buddhist Army (DKBA), headed by a Buddhist monk U Thuzana, since 1992. In the recent years the monks, and the terrorist acts, are associated with the nationalist 969 Movement particularly in Myanmar and neighboring nations. The violence reached prominence in June 2012 when more than 200 people were killed and around 100,000 were displaced. As of 2012, the "969" movement by monks (the prominent among whom is Wirathu) had helped create anti-Islamic nationalist movements in the region, and have urged Myanmar Buddhists to boycott Muslim services and trades, resulting in persecution of Muslims in Burma by Buddhist-led mobs. However, not all of the culprits were Buddhists and the motives were as much economic as religious. On 20 June 2013, Wirathu was mentioned on the cover story of Time magazine as "The Face of Buddhist Terror". According to the Human Rights Watch report, the Burmese government and local authorities played a key role in the forcible displacement of more than 125,000 Rohingya people and other Muslims in the region. The report further specifies the coordinated attacks of October 2012 that were carried out in different cities by Burmese officials, community leaders and Buddhist monks to terrorize and forcibly relocate the population. The violence of Meiktila, Lashio (2013) and Mandalay (2014) are the latest Buddhist violence in Burma.

Michael Jerryson, author of several books heavily critical of Buddhism's traditional peaceful perceptions, stated that, "The Burmese Buddhist monks may not have initiated the violence but they rode the wave and began to incite more. While the ideals of Buddhist canonical texts promote peace and pacifism, discrepancies between reality and precepts easily flourish in times of social, political and economic insecurity, such as Myanmar's current transition to democracy."

However several Buddhist leaders including Thích Nhất Hạnh, Bhikkhu Bodhi, Shodo Harada and the Dalai Lama among others condemned the violence against Muslims in Myanmar and called for peace, supporting the practice of the fundamental Buddhist principles of non-harming, mutual respect and compassion. The Dalai Lama said "Buddha always teaches us about forgiveness, tolerance, compassion. If from one corner of your mind, some emotion makes you want to hit, or want to kill, then please remember Buddha's faith. We are followers of Buddha." He said that "All problems must be solved through dialogue, through talk. The use of violence is outdated, and never solves problems."

Maung Zarni, a Burmese democracy advocate, human rights campaigner, and a research fellow at the London School of Economics who has written on the violence in Myanmar and Sri Lanka, states that there is no room for fundamentalism in Buddhism. "No Buddhist can be nationalistic", said Zarni, "There is no country for Buddhists. I mean, no such thing as 'me,' 'my' community, 'my' country, 'my' race or even 'my' faith."

South Asia

India

Ashokavadana (a text from 3rd cent CE) states that there was a mass killing of Ajivikas for drawing a figure of the Buddha bowing down to the Nataputta by King Ashoka in which around 18,000 Ajivikas were killed. However this account is controversial. According to K. T. S. Sarao and Benimadhab Barua, stories of persecutions of rival sects by Ashoka appear to be a clear fabrication arising out of sectarian propaganda. At that time, the custom of representing Buddha in human form had not started, and the text conflates Nirgranthas and Ajivikas.

Sri Lanka
Buddhism in Sri Lanka has a unique history and has played an important role in the shaping of Sinhalese nationalist identity. Consequently, politicized Buddhism has contributed to ethnic tensions in the island between the majority Sinhalese Buddhist population and other minorities, especially the Tamils.

Violence in Sri Lanka pertaining to Buddhism has been present for decades. This violence originated years ago with the persecution of the Tamil people by the Sinhalese majority. However, after years of discrimination, the Tamil formed the Liberation Tigers of Tamil Eelam (LTTE) which fought for the North-East region of Sri Lanka which would become an independent state for the Tamil population. This civil war continued for three decades and claimed the lives of roughly 40,000 people by the end. The war ended in May 2009 when the majority Sinhalese government killed LTTE leader Velupillai Prabhakaran. After the war, three predominant groups remained in Sri Lanka, this included the Sinhalese which accounted for 70% of the population (most are Buddhist), 10% of the Tamil population (largely Hindu), and 9.7% Muslim. Since Sri Lanka has not stated a national language or religion, Buddhist nationalism began to rise with the fear of Muslims dominating Buddhism. The nationalist organization is called the Bodu Bala Sena (BBS) which is led by Galagoda Aththe Gnanasat.

One of the first major examples of persecution against Muslims was on September 10, 2011 when Buddhist monks destroyed a 300 year old Muslim shrine in Anuradhapura Although police officers were present during the attack, none intervened.

On April 20, 2012, roughly 2000 Buddhist protested outside a mosque in Dambulla because the building stood on a sacred site for Sri Lankan Buddhists. These protests caused the mosque to cancel prayers due to the threats of Buddhist nationalist, but on the following Sunday, Prime Minister D. M. Jayaratne ordered to have the mosque relocated from the sacred site. Since then, the BBS has taken on a new form of persecution by using slogans and propaganda as a way of discriminating against Muslims in Sri Lanka.

With the recent April 2019 Easter bombings orchestrated by Islamic terrorists that claimed the lives of over 250 and injured over 500 Sri Lankans, Muslims in Sri Lanka have faced more danger than ever before from the police and Buddhist nationalists.

Mytho-historical roots
The mytho-historical accounts in the Sinhalese Buddhist national chronicle Mahavamsa ('Great Chronicle'), a non-canonical text written in the sixth century CE by Buddhist monks to glorify Buddhism in Sri Lanka, have been influential in the creation of Sinhalese Buddhist nationalism and militant Buddhism. The Mahavamsa states that Lord Buddha made three visits to Sri Lanka in which he rids the island of forces inimical to Buddhism and instructs deities to protect the ancestors of the Sinhalese (Prince Vijaya and his followers from North India) to enable the establishment and flourishing of Buddhism in Sri Lanka. This myth has led to the widely held Sinhalese Buddhist belief that the country is Sihadipa (island of the Sinhalese) and Dhammadipa (the island ennobled to preserve and propagate Buddhism). In other words, Sinhalese Buddhist nationalists maintain that they are the Buddha's chosen people, and that the island of Sri Lanka is the Buddhist promised land. The Mahavamsa also describes an account of the Buddhist warrior king Dutugamunu, his army, and 500 Buddhist monks battling and defeating the Tamil king Elara, who had come from South India and usurped power in Anuradhapura (the island's capital at the time). When Dutugamunu laments over the thousands he has killed, the eight arhats (Buddha's enlightened disciples) who come to console him reply that no real sin has been committed by him because he has only killed Tamil unbelievers who are no better than beasts, then go on to say: "thou wilt bring glory to the doctrine of the Buddha in manifold ways; therefore cast away care from the heart, O ruler of men".

The Dutugamunu's campaign against king Elara was not to defeat injustice, as the Mahavamsa describes Elara as a good ruler, but to restore Buddhism through a united Sri Lanka under a Buddhist monarch, even by the use of violence. The Mahavamsa story about Buddha's visit to Sri Lanka where he (referred to as the "Conqueror") subdues forces inimical to Buddhism, the Yakkhas (depicted as the non-human inhabitants of the island), by striking "terror to their hearts" and driving them from their homeland, so that his doctrine should eventually "shine in glory", has been described as providing the warrant for the use of violence for the sake of Buddhism and as an account that is in keeping with the general message of the author that the political unity of Sri Lanka under Buddhism requires the removal of uncooperative groups.

According to Neil DeVotta (an Associate Professor of Political Science), the mytho-history described in the Mahavamsa "justifies dehumanizing non-Sinhalese, if doing so is necessary to preserve, protect, and propagate the dhamma (Buddhist doctrine). Furthermore, it legitimizes a just war doctrine, provided that war is waged to protect Buddhism. Together with the Vijaya myth, it introduces the bases for the Sinhalese Buddhist belief that Lord Buddha designated the island of Sri Lanka as a repository for Theravada Buddhism. It claims the Sinhalese were the first humans to inhabit the island (as those who predated the Sinhalese were subhuman) and are thus the true "sons of the soil". Additionally, it institutes the belief that the island's kings were beholden to protect and foster Buddhism. All of these legacies have had ramifications for the trajectory of political Buddhism and Sinhalese Buddhist nationalism."

Rise of modern Sinhalese-Buddhist nationalism
With the rise of modern Sinhalese Buddhist nationalism in the late nineteenth and early twentieth centuries as a reaction to the changes brought under the British colonialism, the old religious mytho-history of the Mahavamsa (especially the emphasis on the Sinhalese and Tamil ethnicities of Duthagamani and Elara, respectively) was revitalized and consequently would prove to be detrimental to the intergroup harmony in the island. As Heather Selma Gregg writes: "Modern-day Sinhalese nationalism, rooted in local myths of being a religiously chosen people and of special progeny, demonstrates that even a religion perceived as inherently peaceful can help fuel violence and hatred in its name."

Buddhist revivalism took place among the Sinhalese to counter Christian missionary influence. The British commissioned the Sinhala translation of the Mahavamsa (which was originally written in Pali), thereby making it accessible to the wider Sinhalese population. During this time the first riot in modern Sri Lankan history broke out in 1883, between Buddhists and Catholics, highlighting the "growing religious divide between the two communities".

The central figure in the formation of modern Sinhalese Buddhist nationalism was the Buddhist revivalist Anagarika Dharmapala (1864–1933), who has been described as "the father of modern Sinhalese Buddhist nationalism". Dharmapala was hostile to all things un-Sinhalese and non-Buddhist. He insisted that the Sinhalese were racially pure and superior Aryans while the Dravidian Tamils were inferior. He popularized the impression that Tamils and Sinhalese had been deadly enemies in Sri Lanka for nearly 2,000 years by quoting the Mahavamsa passages that depicted Tamils as pagan invaders. He characterized the Tamils as "fiercely antagonistic to Buddhism". He also expressed intolerance toward the island's Muslim minorities and other religions in general. Dharmapala also fostered Sinhalese Buddhist nationalism in the spirit of the King Dutthagamani who "rescued Buddhism and our nationalism from oblivion" and stated explicitly that the Island belongs to the Sinhalese Buddhists. Dharmapala has been blamed for laying the groundwork for subsequent Sinhalese Buddhists nationalists to create an ethnocentric state and for hostility to be directed against minorities unwilling to accept such a state.

Politicized Buddhism, the formation of ethnocracy and the civil war
Upon independence Sinhalese Buddhist elites instituted discriminatory policies based on the Buddhist ethno-nationalist ideology of the Mahavamsa that privileges Sinhalese Buddhist hegemony in the island as Buddha's chosen people for whom the island is a promised land and justifies subjugation of minorities. Sinhalese Buddhist officials saw that decreasing Tamil influence was a necessary part of fostering Buddhist cultural renaissance. The Dutthagamani myth was also used to institute Sinhalese Buddhist domination with some politicians even identifying with such a mytho-historic hero and activist monks looked to Dutthagamani as an example to imitate. This principal hero of Mahavamsa became widely regarded as exemplary by the 20th century Sinhalese Buddhist nationalists because of his defense of Buddhism and the unification of Sri Lanka that journalists started talking about "the Mahavamsa mentality".

D. S. Senanayake, who would become Sri Lanka's first prime minister in 1947, reaffirmed in 1939 the common Mahavamsa-based assumption of the Sinhalese Buddhist responsibility for the island's destiny by proclaiming that the Sinhalese Buddhists "are one blood and one nation. We are a chosen people. Buddha said that his religion would last for  years. That means that we, as the custodians of that religion, shall last as long." Buddhists monks became increasingly involved in post-independence politics, promoting Sinhalese Buddhist interests, at the expense of minorities. Walpola Rahula, Sri Lanka's foremost Buddhist monk scholar and one of the leading proponents of Sinhalese Buddhist nationalism, played a major role in advocating for the involvement of monks in politics, using Buddhist king Dutthagamani's relationship with the sangha to bolster his position. Rahula also argued for a just war doctrine to protect Buddhism by using the example of wars waged by Dutthagamani to restore Buddhism. Rahula maintained that "the entire Sinhalese race was united under the banner of the young Gamini [Dutthagamani]. This was the beginning of nationalism among the Sinhalese. It was a new race with healthy young blood, organized under the new order of Buddhism. A kind of religionationalism, which almost amounted to fanaticism, roused the whole Sinhalese people. A non-Buddhist was not regarded as a human being. Evidently all Sinhalese without exception were Buddhists." In reflecting on Rahula's works, anthropologist H.L. Seneviratne wrote that "it suits Rahula to be an advocate of a Buddhism that glorifies social intercourse with lay society ... the receipt of salaries and other forms of material remuneration; ethnic exclusivism and Sinhala Buddhist hegemony; militancy in politics; and violence, war and the spilling of blood in the name of "preserving the religion"".

In 1956, the All Ceylon Buddhist Congress (ACBC) released a report titled, "The Betrayal of Buddhism", inquiring into the status of Buddhism in the island. The report argued that Buddhism had been weakened by external threats such as the Tamil invaders mentioned in the Mahavamsa and later Western colonial powers. It also demanded the state to restore and foster Buddhism and to give preferential treatment to Buddhist schools. The same year, S. W. R. D. Bandaranaike capitalized on the ACBC report and its recommendations as the foundation for his election campaign, using it as the 'blueprint for a broad spectrum of policy', which included introducing Sinhala as the sole official language of the state. With the help of significant number of Buddhist monks and various Sinhalese Buddhist organizations, Bandaranaike became prime minister after winning the 1956 elections. Bandaranaike had also campaigned on the basis of Sinhalese Buddhist nationalism, drawing influences from the writings of Dharmapala and the Mahavamsa, arguing that it was the duty of the government to preserve the Sinhalese Buddhist nature of the island's destiny. Once in power, Bandaranaike implemented the 1956 Sinhala Only Act, which would make Sinhala the country's official language and hence all official state transactions would be conducted in Sinhala. This put non-Sinhala speakers at a disadvantage for employment and educational opportunities. As a result, Tamils protested the policy by staging sit-ins, which in turn prompted counterdemonstrations by Buddhist monks, later degenerating into anti-Tamil riots in which more than one hundred people were injured and Tamil businesses were looted. Riots then spread throughout the country, killing hundreds of people. Bandaranaike tried to mitigate tensions over the language policy by proposing a compromise with the Tamil leaders, resulting in a 1957 pact that would allow the use of Tamil as an administrative language along with Sinhala and greater political autonomy for Tamils. Buddhist monks and other Sinhalese nationalists opposed this pact by staging mass demonstrations and hunger strikes. In an editorial in the same year, a monk asked Bandaranaike to read the Mahavamsa and to heed its lessons: "[Dutthagamani] conquered by the sword and united the land [Sri Lanka] without dividing it among our enemies [i.e. the Tamils] and established Sinhala and Buddhism as the state language and religion." In the late 1950s, it had become common for politicians and monks to exploit the Mahavamsa narrative of Dutthagamani to oppose any concession to the Tamil minorities.

With Buddhist monks playing a major role in exerting pressure to abrogate the pact, Bandaranaike acceded to their demands on April 9, 1958 by tearing up "a copy of the pact in front of the assembled monks who clapped in joy". Soon after the pact was abrogated, another series of anti-Tamil riots spread throughout the country, which left hundreds dead and thousands displaced. Preceding the 1958 riots, rhetoric of monks contributed to the perception of Tamils being the enemies of the country and of Buddhism. Both Buddhist monks and laity laid the foundation for the justifiable use of force against Tamils in response to their demand for greater autonomy by arguing that the whole of Sri Lanka was a promised land of the Sinhalese Buddhists and it was the role of the monks to defend a united Sri Lanka. Tamils were also portrayed as threatening interlopers, compared to the Mahavamsa account of the usurper Tamil king Elara. Monks and politicians invoked the story of the Buddhist warrior king Dutthagamani to urge the Sinhalese to fight against Tamils and their claims to the island, thereby providing justification for violence against Tamils. As Tessa J. Bartholomeusz explained: "Tamil claims to a homeland were met with an ideology, linked to a Buddhist story, that legitimated war with just cause: the protection of Sri Lanka for the Sinhala-Buddhist people." In order to appease Tamils amidst the ethnic tension, Bandaranaike modified the Sinhala Only Act to allow Tamil to be used in education and government in Tamil areas, and as a result a Buddhist monk named Talduwe Somarama assassinated him on September 26, 1959. The monk claimed he carried out the assassination "for the greater good of his country, race and religion". It has also been suggested that the monk was guided in part by reading of the Mahavamsa.

Successive governments after Bandaranaike implemented a similar Sinhalese Buddhist nationalist agenda, at the expense of minorities. In 1972, the government rewrote its constitution and gave Buddhism "the foremost place [in the Republic of Sri Lanka]" and making it "the duty of the state to protect and foster Buddhism". With another pact in 1965 that sought to establish greater regional autonomy for Tamils being abrogated (some members of the Buddhist clergy were at the forefront in opposing the pact) and the implementation of discriminatory quota system in 1974 that severely restricted Tamil entrance to universities, Tamil youth became radicalized, calling for an independent homeland to be established in the Tamil-dominated northeastern region of the island. In 1977, anti-Tamil riots spread throughout the country, killing hundreds of Tamils and leaving thousands homeless. A leading monk claimed that one of the reasons for the anti-Tamil riots of 1977 was the Tamil demonization of the Sinhalese Buddhist epic hero Dutthagamani, which resulted in a justified retaliation. Another anti-Tamil riot erupted in 1981 in Jaffna, where Sinhalese police and paramilitaries destroyed statues of Tamil cultural and religious figures; looted and torched a Hindu temple and Tamil-owned shops and homes; killed four Tamils; and torched the Jaffna Public Library which was of great cultural significance to Tamils. In response to the militant separatist Tamil group LTTE killing 13 Sinhalese soldiers, the largest anti-Tamil pogrom occurred in 1983, leaving between 2,000 and 3,000 of Tamils killed and forcing from 70,000 to 100,000 Tamils into refugee camps, eventually propelling the country into a civil war between the LTTE and the predominately Sinhalese Buddhist Sri Lankan government. In the 1983 anti-Tamil pogrom, Buddhist monks lead rioters in some instance. Cyril Mathew, a Senior Minister in President Jayawardene's Cabinet and a Sinhalese Buddhist nationalist who in the year preceding the pogrom reaffirmed the special relationship between Buddhism and Sinhalese and the Buddhist nature of the country, was also responsible for the pogrom. In the months following the anti-Tamil pogrom, authorizations for violence against Tamils began to appear in the press, with Tamils being depicted as interlopers on Dhammadipa. The Mahavamsa narrative of Dutthagamani and Elara was also invoked to justify violence against Tamils. The aftermath of the pogrom spawned debates over the rights to the island with the "sons of the soil" ideology being called into prominence. A government agent declared that Sri Lanka's manifest destiny "was to uphold the pristine doctrine of Theravada Buddhism". This implied that Sinhalese Buddhists had a sacred claim to Sri Lanka, while the Tamils did not, a claim which might call for violence. The Sinhalese Buddhists, including the Sri Lankan government, resisted the Tamil claim to a separate homeland of their own as the Sinhalese Buddhists maintained that the entire country belonged to them. Another government agent linked the then Prime Minister Jayewardene's attempts to thwart the emergence of a Tamil homeland to Dutthagamani's victory over Elara and went on to say, "[w]e will never allow the country to be divided", thereby justifying violence against Tamils.

In the context of increasing Tamil militant struggle for separatism, militant Buddhist monks founded the Mavbima Surakime Vyaparaya (MSV) or "Movement for the Protection of the Motherland" in 1986 which sought to work with political parties "to maintain territorial unity of Sri Lanka and Sinhalese Buddhist sovereignty over the island". The MSV used the Mahavamsa to justify its goals, which included the usage of force to fight against the Tamil threat and defend the Buddhist state. In 1987, along with the MSV, the Janatha Vimukthi Peramuna (JVP, a militant Sinhalese nationalist group which included monks) took up arms to protest the signing of the Indo-Sri Lanka Accord which sought to establish peace in Sri Lanka by requiring the Sri Lankan government to make a number of concessions to Tamil demands, including devolution of power to Tamil provinces. The JVP, with the support of the Sangha, launched a campaign of violent insurrection against the government to oppose the accord as the Sinhalese nationalists believed it would compromise the sovereignty of Sri Lanka.

From the beginning of the civil war in 1983 to the end of it in 2009, Buddhist monks were involved in politics and opposed negotiations, ceasefire agreements, or any devolution of power to Tamil minorities, and most supported military solution to the conflict. This has led to Asanga Tilakaratne, head of the Department of Buddhist Philosophy in the Postgraduate Institute of Pali and Buddhist Studies in Colombo, to remark that "the Sinhala Buddhist nationalists are ... opposed to any attempt to solve the ethnic problem by peaceful means; and they call for a 'holy war' against Tamils". It has been argued that the absence of opportunities for power sharing among the different ethnic groups in the island "has been one of the primary factors behind the intensification of the conflict". Numerous Buddhist religious leaders and Buddhist organizations since the country's independence have played a role in mobilizing against the devolution of power to the Tamils. Leading Buddhist monks opposed devolution of power that would grant regional autonomy to Tamils on the basis of Mahavamsa worldview that the entire country is a Buddhist promised land which belongs to the Sinhalese Buddhist people, along with the fear that devolution would eventually lead to separate country.

The two major contemporary political parties to advocate for Sinhalese Buddhist nationalism are the JVP and the Jathika Hela Urumaya (JHU) or "National Heritage Party", the latter of which is composed solely of Buddhist monks. According to A. R. M. Imtiyaz, these groups share common goals: "to uphold Buddhism and establish a link between the state and religion, and to advocate a violent solution to the Tamil question and oppose all form of devolution to the minorities, particularly the Tamils". The JHU, in shunning non-violent solutions to the ethnic conflict, urged young Sinhalese Buddhists to sign up for the army, with as many as 30,000 Sinhalese young men doing just that. One JHU leader even declared that NGOs and certain government servants were traitors and they should be set on fire and burnt due to their opposition to a military solution to the civil war. The international community encouraged a federal structure for Sri Lanka as a peaceful solution to the civil war but any form of Tamil self-determination, even the more limited measure of autonomy, was strongly opposed by hard-line Sinhalese Buddhist nationalist groups such as the JVP and JHU, who pushed for the military solution. These groups in their hard-line support for a military solution to the conflict, without any regard for the plight of innocent Tamil civilians, have opposed negotiated settlement, ceasefire agreement, demanded that the Norwegians be removed as peace facilitators, demanded the war to be prosecuted more forcefully and exerted influence in the Rajapaksa government (which they helped to elect), resulting in the brutal military defeat of the LTTE with heavy civilian casualties. The nationalist monks' support of the government's military offense against the LTTE gave "religious legitimacy to the state's claim of protecting the island for the Sinhalese Buddhist majority." President Rajapaksa, in his war against the LTTE, has been compared to the Buddhist king Dutthagamani by the Sinhalese Buddhist nationalists.

Violence against religious minorities
Other minority groups have also come under attack by Sinhalese Buddhist nationalists. Fear of country's Buddhist hegemony being challenged by Christian proselytism has driven Buddhist monks and organizations to demonize Christian organizations, with one popular monk comparing missionary activity to terrorism; as a result, Sinhalese Buddhist nationalists, including the JVP and JHU, who oppose attempts to convert Buddhists to another religion, support or conduct anti-Christian violence. The number of attacks against Christian churches rose from 14 in 2000 to over 100 in 2003. Dozens of these acts were confirmed by U.S. diplomatic observers. This anti-Christian violence was led by extremist Buddhist clergy and has included acts of "beatings, arson, acts of sacrilege, death threats, violent disruption of worship, stoning, abuse, unlawful restraint, and even interference with funerals". It has been noted that the strongest anti-West sentiments accompany the anti-Christian violence since the Sinhalese Buddhist nationalists identify Christianity with the West which they think is conspiring to undermine Buddhism.

In the postwar Sri Lanka, ethnic and religious minorities continue to face threat from Sinhalese Buddhist nationalism. There have been continued sporadic attacks on Christian churches by Buddhist extremists who allege that Christians conduct unethical or forced conversion. The Pew Research Center has listed Sri Lanka among the countries with very high religious hostilities in 2012 due to the violence committed by Buddhist monks against Muslim and Christian places of worship. These acts included attacking a mosque and forcefully taking over a Seventh-day advent church and converting it into a Buddhist temple.

Extremist Buddhist leaders justify their attacks on the places of worship of minorities by arguing that Sri Lanka is the promised land of the Sinhalese Buddhists to safeguard Buddhism. The recently formed Buddhist extremist group, the Bodu Bala Sena (BBS), or Buddhist Power Force, founded by Buddhist monks in 2012, has been accused of inciting the anti-Muslim riots that killed 4 Muslims and injured 80 in 2014. The leader of the BBS, in linking the government's military victory over the LTTE to the ancient Buddhist king conquest of Tamil king Elara, said that Tamils have been taught a lesson twice and warned other minorities of the same fate if they tried to challenge Sinhalese Buddhist culture. The BBS has been compared to the Taliban, accused of spreading extremism and communal hatred against Muslims and has been described as an "ethno-religious fascist movement". Buddhist monks have also protested against UN Human Rights Council resolution that called for an inquiry into humanitarian abuses and possible war crimes during the civil war. The BBS has received criticism and opposition from other Buddhist clergy and politicians. Mangala Samaraweera, a Sri Lankan Theravada Buddhist politician who has served as Minister of Foreign Affairs since 2015, has accused the BBS of being "a representation of 'Taliban' terrorism" and of spreading extremism and communal hatred against Muslims. Samaraweera has also alleged that the BBS is secretly funded by the Ministry of Defence. Anunayake Bellanwila Wimalaratana, deputy incumbent of Bellanwila Rajamaha Viharaya and President of the Bellanwila Community Development Foundation, has stated that "The views of the Bodu Bala Sena are not the views of the entire Sangha community" and that "We don't use our fists to solve problems, we use our brains". Wataraka Vijitha Thero, a Buddhist monk who condemns violence against Muslims and heavily criticized the BBS and the government, has been attacked and tortured for his stances.

Buddhist opposition to Sinhala Buddhist nationalism
Sinhala Buddhist Nationalism is opposed to Sarvodaya, although they share many of the same influences like Dharmapāla's teachings for example, by having a focus upon Sinhalese culture and ethnicity sanctioning the use of violence in defence of dhamma, while Sarvodaya has emphasized the application of Buddhist values in order to transform society and campaigning for peace.

These Buddhist nationalists have been opposed by the Sarvodaya Shramadana Movement, a self-governance movement led by the Buddhist Dr. A. T. Ariyaratne and based in Buddhist ideals, who condemn the use of violence and the denial of human rights to Tamils and other non-Buddhists. Ariyaratne calls for non-violent action and he has been actively working for peace in Sri Lanka for many decades, and has stated that the only way to peace is through "the dispelling of the view of 'I and mine' or the shedding of 'self' and the realization of the true doctrines of the interconnection between all animal species and the unity of all humanity", thus advocating social action in Buddhist terms. He stated in one of his lectures, "When we work towards the welfare of all the means we use have to be based on Truth, Non-violence and Selflessness in conformity with Awakening of All". What Ariyaratne advocates is losing the self in the service of others and attempting to bring others to awakening. Ariyaratne has stated, "I cannot awaken myself unless I help awaken others".

East Asia

Japan

The beginning of "Buddhist violence" in Japan relates to a long history of feuds among Buddhists. The sōhei or "warrior monks" appeared during the Heian period, although the seeming contradiction in being a Buddhist "warrior monk" caused controversy even at the time. More directly linked is that the Ikkō-shū movement was considered an inspiration to Buddhists in the Ikkō-ikki rebellion. In Osaka they defended their temple with the slogan "The mercy of Buddha should be recompensed even by pounding flesh to pieces. One's obligation to the Teacher should be recompensed even by smashing bones to bits!"

During World War II, Japanese Buddhist literature from that time, as part of its support of the Japanese war effort, stated "In order to establish eternal peace in East Asia, arousing the great benevolence and compassion of Buddhism, we are sometimes accepting and sometimes forceful. We now have no choice but to exercise the benevolent forcefulness of 'killing one in order that many may live' (issatsu tashō). This is something which Mahayana Buddhism approves of only with the greatest of seriousness..." Almost all Japanese Buddhists temples strongly supported Japan's militarization. These were heavily criticized by the Chinese Buddhists of the era, who disputed the validity of the statements made by those Japanese Buddhist supporters of the war. In response the Japanese Pan-Buddhist Society (Myowa Kai) rejected the criticism and stated that "We now have no choice but to exercise the benevolent forcefulness of 'killing one in order that many may live' (issatsu tashō)" and that the war was absolutely necessary to implement the dharma in Asia. The society re-examined more than 70 texts written by Nichiren and re-edited his writings, making changes in 208 places, cutting all the statements that disagreed with the state Shinto. In contrast, a few Japanese Buddhists such as Ichikawa Haku and Seno'o Girō opposed this and were targeted. During the 1940s, "leaders of the Honmon Hokkeshu and Soka Kyoiku Gakkai were imprisoned for their defiance of wartime government religious policy, which mandated display of reverence for the state Shinto".
Brian Daizen Victoria, a Buddhist priest in the Sōtō Zen sect, documented in his book Zen at War how Buddhist institutions justified Japanese militarism in official publications and cooperated with the Imperial Japanese Army in the Russo-Japanese War and World War II. In response to the book, several sects issued an apology for their wartime support of the government.

In more modern times instances of Buddhist-inspired terrorism or militarism have occurred in Japan, such as the assassinations of the League of Blood Incident led by Nissho Inoue, a Nichirenist or fascist-nationalist who preached a self-styled Nichiren Buddhism.

Aum Shinrikyo, the Japanese new religion and doomsday cult that was the cause of the Tokyo subway sarin attack that killed thirteen people and injured more than a thousand, drew upon a syncretic view of idiosyncratic interpretations of elements of early Indian Buddhism, Tibetan Buddhism and Hinduism, taking Shiva as the main image of worship, Christian millennialist ideas from the Book of Revelation, Yoga and the writings of Nostradamus. Its founder, Chizuo Matsumoto, claimed that he sought to restore "original Buddhism" and declared himself "Christ", Japan's only fully enlightened master and identified with the "Lamb of God". His purported mission was to take upon himself the sins of the world, and he claimed he could transfer to his followers spiritual power and ultimately take away their sins and bad deeds. While many discount Aum Shinrikyo's Buddhist characteristics and affiliation to Buddhism, scholars often refer to it as an offshoot of Japanese Buddhism, and this was how the movement generally defined and saw itself.

See also

Ahimsa in Buddhism
Buddhism and capital punishment
Buddhist ethics
Religious nationalism
Sohei

References

Sources

 
 
  Via Google Books
 

 
 
 
 
 
 
 
 
 
 
 
 

 
 
 
 
 
 
 
 
 
 
 
 
 
 
 
 
 

 

 
Buddhism and other religions
Religious terrorism
Buddhism articles needing attention
Buddhist fundamentalism